Ann Hould-Ward (born April 8, 1954, in Glasgow, Montana) is an American costume designer, primarily for the theatre and dance. She has designed the costumes for 24 Broadway productions (as of February 2021). She won the 1994 Tony Award for Beauty and the Beast.

Biography
Ann Hould-Ward attended Mills College (B.A.), the University of Virginia (M.F.A.), and the Art Students League. After writing to Patricia Zipprodt asking for a job, she was introduced by her to Rouben Ter-Arutunian and became his assistant. She later was Zipprodt's assistant.

Her first Broadway costume designs were for the musical Sunday in the Park with George (1984), in collaboration with Patricia Zipprodt, for which they received a joint Tony Award nomination.  She designed the costumes for the Broadway musical A Catered Affair (2008), for which she received the 2008 Drama Desk Award nomination for Outstanding Costume Design. Her costumes for Beauty and the Beast (tour) were called "luscious, from peasant garb in the early scenes to elegant formal wear in the finale and the ornate costumes of the half-human candlesticks, clocks and teapots that share the Beast's spell." In reviewing Stephen Sondheim's Road Show, the theatermania.com reviewer noted: "Still, the ensemble members definitely look smart in the outfits Ann Hould-Ward has designed to conjure the blueprints Addison ran up for his fabled Palm Beach homes." Her costume designs for the revival of Sondheim's Company were called " dark, sleek costumes" by the USA Today reviewer.

She has designed costumes for many regional theater companies. At the La Jolla Playhouse (California) she designed the costumes for Going To St. Ives in 2000. Her costume designs for Red, Hot and Blue were used in productions at the Goodspeed Opera House, East Haddam, Connecticut in 2000 and the Paper Mill Playhouse, Millburn, New Jersey in 2001. According to John Kenrick her "costumes hit all the right notes". Her work at The Old Globe Theatre, San Diego, California, includes The Countess in 2001.  She designed costumes for several productions at the Arena Stage, Washington, DC, including Three Sisters (1984), Sondheim's Merrily We Roll Along (1990) and Let Me Down Easy (2010).

Her Off-Broadway work includes, at Playwrights Horizons Lobster Alice (2000), at the Public Theater Road Show (2008), and at Second Stage Theatre Let Me Down Easy, by Anna Deavere Smith (2009). Her costumes for The Public Theater Shakespeare in the Park outdoor staging of A Midsummer Night’s Dream in 2007 were said to be "stunning, audaciously conceived Victorian costumes. Enos looks scrumptious enough to eat in her pink and white bustled dress that might easily pass muster as a wedding cake." She designed the costumes for the US National tour of Dr. Dolittle (2005); Hould-Ward stated that she "drew inspiration from the horse's mouth, so to speak; she found original copies of the Hugh Lofting books that were simply illustrated by the author himself."

Hould-Ward has designed costumes for dance and ballet, including the Ballet Hispanico, Lar Lubovitch's The White Oak Project, and the American Ballet Theatre. She also designs for the opera. She designed the costumes for the Los Angeles Opera production of Rise and Fall of the City of Mahagonny (2007), starring Audra McDonald and Patti LuPone.

She designed costumes for Ringling Bros. and Barnum & Bailey Circus in 2001.
Her career reached stratospheric heights during 2014 when she was entrusted with redesigning the outfit of America's favourite hamburger clown, Ronald McDonald. She described this as a "highlight" of her career, and few would argue this statement. Her inspired creation centred around a natty red jacket, a matching bow tie & cargo pants.

Work

Stage (selected)
Sources:
The Color Purple (2015)
The Visit (2015)
The People in the Picture (2011)
A Free Man of Color (2010)
The Grand Manner (2010)
A Catered Affair (2008) (2008 Drama Desk AwardOutstanding Costume Design nominee)
Road Show (2008)
Company (2006)
Dance of the Vampires (2002)
Little Me (1998)
More to Love (1998)
Dream (1997)<ref>Marks, Peter."Theater Review:A Parade of Hits 5 Decades Long"The New York Times', April 4, 1997</ref>On the Waterfront (1995)The Molière Comedies (1995)Beauty and the Beast (1994) (1994 Tony Award Best Costume Design winner)Timon of Athens  (1993)In the Summer House  (1993)Three Men on a Horse  (1993)Saint Joan  (1993)Falsettos (1992)Into the Woods (1987 and 1997 concert) (1988 Tony Award and Drama Desk Award for Costume Design nominee)Harrigan 'n Hart (1985)Sunday in the Park with George (1984) (1984 Tony Award and Drama Desk Award for Costume Design nominee)

Ballet, Dance and Opera
Sources:"Ann Hould-Ward, Costume Designer"Seattle Opera, accessed February 13, 2011
American Ballet TheatreOthello (1997), Meadow (1999), The Pied Piper (2001) and Artemis (2003)
Ballet HispanicoStages (1990), Guahira (1999)

Opera
Metropolitan Opera -Peter Grimes (Britten) (2008)
New York City Opera - The Most Happy Fella (Loesser)
Los Angeles Opera - Rise and Fall of the City of Mahagonny (2007) (Weill)
Florida Grand Opera - Regina (Blitzstein) (2002)"'Regina', Florida Gand Opera, 2002"   operaamerica.org, accessed February 13, 2011
Seattle Opera - Amelia (2010)

References

Sources
Pecktal, Lynn. Costume Design'' (1999). Back Stage Books, pp. 98–109

External links

Credits at broadwayworld.com
Off-Broadway Database listing
Ann Hould-Ward designs, 1980-2019, held by the Billy Rose Theatre Division, New York Public Library for the Performing Arts

American costume designers
Artists from New York City
Tony Award winners
1954 births
Living people
People from Glasgow, Montana
Mills College alumni
University of Virginia alumni
Women costume designers